A Leprechaun is a type of male faerie in Irish mythology.

Leprechaun may also refer to:

Film 
 Leprechaun (film), a 1993 horror film
 Leprechaun (film series), a horror film and comic franchise

Music 
 The Leprechaun (Chick Corea album) (1976)
 The Leprechaun (Lil' Flip album) (2000)

Other uses 
 Leprechaun (video game), a 1982 arcade game
 Leprechaunism or Donohue syndrome
 Notre Dame Leprechaun, mascot of the University of Notre Dame
 DeWayne Bruce or (Braun) The Leprechaun, professional wrestler

See also
 Crichton Leprechaun, a news story of a purported leprechaun in Mobile, Alabama
 Irish mythology in popular culture, have appeared many times in popular culture
 Kobold, (occasionally cobold) is a sprite stemming from Germanic mythology and surviving into modern times in German folklore
 Leprechaun economics, a term coined by Paul Krugman for Ireland's 2015 26.3% GDP growth rate
 Leprecon (disambiguation)
 Lucky the Leprechaun, the mascot of Lucky Charms brand breakfast cereal
 Menninkäinen, in Finnish mythology, an equivalent to the leprechaun